Kari Tapani Tolvanen (born 24 July 1961, in Helsinki) is a Finnish politician currently serving in the Parliament of Finland for the National Coalition Party at the Uusimaa constituency.

References

1961 births
Living people
Politicians from Helsinki
National Coalition Party politicians
Members of the Parliament of Finland (2011–15)
Members of the Parliament of Finland (2015–19)
Members of the Parliament of Finland (2019–23)